ACOS or Acos may refer to:

 Arccosine, an inverse trigonometric function
 The Advanced Comprehensive Operating System mainframe computer operating system
 Acos District in Peru
 Acos Vinchos District in Peru
 A Crown of Swords novel

See also

 Aco (disambiguation)
 Cos (disambiguation)